Marie Allan (born 1979) is a French actress. She appeared as a leading actress in Jean-Claude Brisseau's 2006 Cannes Film Festival film Les Anges Exterminateurs.

Selected filmography

References

External links

1979 births

Living people

French film actresses

21st-century French actresses